Nephtys is a genus of marine catworms. Some species are halotolerant to a degree in that they can survive in estuaries and estuarine lagoons down to a salinity of 20 psu (Practical Salinity Units).

Species
Nephtys caeca (Fabricius, 1780)
Nephtys ciliata (Müller, 1788) - typetaxon
Nephtys hombergii (Savigny in Lamarck, 1818)
Nephtys longosetosa (Örsted, 1842)

References 
 ERMS: The European Register of Marine Species 
 MarLIN: The Marine Life Information Network for Britain and Ireland 

Polychaete genera
Phyllodocida